The 10th Lo Nuestro Awards ceremony, presented by Univision honoring the best Latin music of 1997 and 1998 took place on May 14, 1998, at a live presentation held at the James L. Knight Center in Miami, Florida. The ceremony was broadcast in the United States and Latin America by Univision.

During the ceremony, nineteen categories were presented. Winners were announced at the live event and included Mexican singer Alejandro Fernández receiving four competitive awards. Other multiple winners were fellow Mexican singer-songwriter Juan Gabriel, Spanish singer Rocío Dúrcal and Colombian performer Charlie Zaa with two awards each. Fernández won the award for "Pop Album of the Year," Gabriel and Dúrcal earned the award for "Regional Mexican Album of the Year," and Zaa won for "Tropical/Salsa Album of the Year." A special tribute was given to Mexican singer Lucero and the Excellence Award was received by Mexican trio Los Panchos.

Background 
In 1989, the Lo Nuestro Awards were established by Univision, to recognize the most talented performers of Latin music. The nominees and winners were selected by a voting poll conducted among program directors of Spanish-language radio stations in the United States and the results were tabulated and certified by the accounting firm Arthur Andersen. The categories included are for the Pop, Tropical/Salsa, Regional Mexican and Music Video. The trophy awarded is shaped like a treble clef. The 10th Lo Nuestro Awards ceremony was held on May 14, 1998, in a live presentation held at the James L. Knight Center in Miami, Florida. The ceremony was broadcast in the United States and Latin America by Univision.

Winners and nominees 

Winners were announced before the live audience during the ceremony. Mexican singer Alejandro Fernández was the most nominated performer, with eight nominations which resulted in four wins which included both Pop and Regional Male Artist of the Year, Pop Album and Pop Song of the Year. Mexican singer-songwriter Juan Gabriel and Spanish singer Rocío Dúrcal were awarded as Pop Group of the Year and Regional Mexican Album with Juntos Otra Vez. 

All songs nominated for Pop Song of the Year reached number one at the Billboard Top Latin Songs chart: Fernández "Si Tú Supieras", Cristian's "Lo Mejor de Mí", both Gabriel's "Te Sigo Amando" and "El Destino", and Luis Miguel's "Por Debajo de la Mesa"; "La Venia Bendita" by Marco Antonio Solís was named "Regional Mexican Song of the Year" and also reached number one in the chart. Guatemalan performer Ricardo Arjona earned the accolade for Best Music Video for "Ella y Él". Colombian singer Charlie Zaa dominated the Tropical/Salsa field winning two awards, for Male Singer of the Year and Album of the Year with Sentimientos; American performer Marc Anthony earned Song of the Year for "Y Hubo Alguien", while Dominican band Ilegales won for Group of the Year.

Honorary awards
Excellence Award: Los Panchos.
Special Tribute: Lucero.

See also
1997 in Latin music
1998 in Latin music
Grammy Award for Best Latin Pop Album
Grammy Award for Best Mexican/Mexican-American Album
Grammy Award for Best Traditional Tropical Latin Album

References

1998 music awards
Lo Nuestro Awards by year
1998 in Florida
1998 in Latin music
1990s in Miami